Bells Mills is an unincorporated community in Jefferson County, in the U.S. state of Pennsylvania.

History
A post office called Bell's Mills was established in 1863, and remained in operation until 1907. The community was named for James H. Bell, who started a mill and kept a store there.

References

Unincorporated communities in Jefferson County, Pennsylvania
Unincorporated communities in Pennsylvania